Pope Felix IV (489/490 – 22 September 530) was the bishop of Rome from 12 July 526 to his death. He was the chosen candidate of Ostrogoth King Theodoric the Great, who had imprisoned Felix's predecessor, John I.

Rise
Felix came from Samnium, the son of Castorius. He was elected after a gap of nearly two months after the death of John I, who had died in prison in Ravenna, having completed a diplomatic mission to Constantinople on behalf of the Ostrogoth King Theodoric the Great. The papal electors acceded to the king's demands and chose Felix as pope. Felix's favor in the eyes of the king allowed him to press for greater benefits for the church. However, Theodoric died later that year, allowing Felix to pursue his own policies in peace.

Pontificate 
Felix built the Santi Cosma e Damiano in the Imperial forums on land donated by Queen Amalasuntha,
and consecrated no fewer than thirty-nine bishops, during his short tenure of four years. During Felix's pontificate, an imperial edict was passed granting that cases against clergy should be dealt with by the pope or a designated ecclesiastical court. Violation of this ruling would result in a fine, which proceeds were designated for the poor. Felix also defined church teaching on grace and free will in response to a request of Faustus of Riez, in Gaul, on opposing Semi-Pelagianism. As such, Felix approved the teachings of the Council of Orange in 529, which also explained original sin.

Felix attempted to designate his own successor: Pope Boniface II. The reaction of the Senate was to forbid the discussion of a pope's successor during his lifetime or to accept such a nomination. The majority of the clergy reacted to Felix's activity by nominating Dioscorus as Pope. Only a minority supported Boniface. His feast day is celebrated on 30 January.

References

External links 

 Opera Omnia by Migne Patrologia Latina with analytical indexes
Fontes Latinae de papis usque ad annum 530
Liber pontificalis

 

530 deaths
6th-century Christian saints
Italian popes
Ostrogothic Papacy
Papal saints
Samnite people
Popes
Year of birth unknown
6th-century popes
Year of birth uncertain
Burials at St. Peter's Basilica